Ricardo Vargas (born 21 November 1997) is a Mexican swimmer. He competed in the men's 1500 metre freestyle event at the 2016 Summer Olympics.

References

External links
 

1997 births
Living people
Mexican male swimmers
Olympic swimmers of Mexico
Swimmers at the 2016 Summer Olympics
Swimmers at the 2019 Pan American Games
Swimmers at the 2014 Summer Youth Olympics
Pan American Games medalists in swimming
Pan American Games bronze medalists for Mexico
Central American and Caribbean Games gold medalists for Mexico
Central American and Caribbean Games medalists in swimming
Competitors at the 2018 Central American and Caribbean Games
Mexican male freestyle swimmers
Medalists at the 2019 Pan American Games
21st-century Mexican people